The 2005 Super League Grand Final was the 8th official Grand Final and the conclusive and championship-deciding match of the Super League X season. Held on Saturday 15 October 2005, at Old Trafford, Manchester, the game was played between Bradford Bulls, who finished 3rd in the league after the 28 weekly rounds, and Leeds Rhinos, who finished second after the weekly rounds.

Route to final

Route to the Final

Leeds Rhinos

Bradford Bulls

Match details

See also
2005 Bradford Bulls season
2006 World Club Challenge

References

External links
2005 Super League Grand Final at rlphotos.com

Super League Grand Finals
Bradford Bulls matches
Leeds Rhinos matches
Grand Final